The Fauvel AV.31 was a design for a French flying wing airliner conceived by Charles Fauvel in the early 1940s.

Design and development
All the passengers, fuel, and engines were situated in the wing, reducing the cockpit to a small nacelle in front of the wing. The passenger cabin, fully submerged in the wing, was 27 m long and 9 m wide, and could accommodate a variety of layouts. A bomber version was proposed as the AV.32.

The AV.31, despite its great potential, did not leave the drawing board.

References

See also

Tailless aircraft
Flying wings
1940s French airliners
Fauvel aircraft